Marauder is a live album by the English rock band Magnum. It was released in 1980 on Jet Records. Magnum recorded Marauder over one night at London's Marquee Club on 15 December 1979. It was an attempt by Jet Records to revive the success of the debut album Kingdom of Madness following the failure of Magnum II. The album was recorded on multi-track by former-Ten Years After bass player Leo Lyons, who had recorded Magnum II, and mixed by Chris Tsangarides.

The eight-track live album was released in April 1980, entering the UK charts at No. 34. A four-track EP preceded the album's release in March 1980, called Live at the Marquee, featuring material from the same show. The EP charted within the Top 50 of the UK singles chart, and very nearly earned the band an appearance on Top of the Pops. Following this revival, "Changes" was re-released as a single, although in a remixed format. The 2005 expanded version of the album was reissued on 22 September 2006 in Japan with Mini LP/paper sleeve packaging through Arcangelo. The album was also included in a limited edition Japanese box set, comprising all six of Sanctuary Records expanded and remastered releases with Mini LP/Paper Sleeve packaging. The set included an outer box featuring Magnum's Chase The Dragon artwork.

Track listing

Reissues

Bonus tracks
Sanctuary Records released a 2005 Remastered and Expanded edition with a Bonus Tracks.

"All of My Life", "Great Adventure", "Invasion" and "Kingdom of Madness" (Disc 1, 9 – 12)
These tracks are taken from the EP "Live at the Marquee", recorded from the Marauder show at The Marquee, London, thus offering the show in its entirety.

"Reborn", "Changes", "All of My Life", "Invasion" and "Kingdom of Madness" (Disc 1, 13 – 17)
These tracks were recorded live in 1982 in Nashville, Tennessee whilst supporting Ozzy Osbourne. These tracks were originally released on Invasion Live.

Singles
Live at the Marquee 7" (March 1980)
"All of My Life" [Live] – 6:17
"Great Adventure" [Live] – 4:24

Live at the Marquee EP (March 1980)
"All of My Life" [Live] – 6:17
"Great Adventure" [Live] – 4:24
"Invasion" [Live] – 5:10
"Kingdom of Madness" [Live] – 3:57

Changes 7" (1980)
"Changes" [Remix] – 4:11
"Everybody Needs" [B-Side] – 2:52
"Changes" [Live] – 3:13

Personnel
Tony Clarkin – Guitar
Bob Catley – Vocals
Wally Lowe – Bass
Kex Gorin – Drums
Richard Bailey – Keyboards, Flute (on 1 – 12)
Mark Stanway – Keyboards (on 13 – 17)

References

External links
 www.magnumonline.co.uk — Official Magnum site
 Marauder: Expanded Edition – Sanctuary Records' mini site

Albums produced by Leo Lyons
Magnum (band) live albums
1980 live albums
Jet Records live albums